The Society for Savings Building, also known as the Society Corp. Building, is a high-rise building on Public Square in Downtown Cleveland, Ohio, United States. The building was constructed in 1889, and stood as the tallest building in Cleveland until 1896, when it was surpassed by the 221-foot (67 m) Guardian Bank Building. The building stands 152 feet (46 m) tall, with 10 floors. The Society for Savings Building is often considered to be the first modern skyscraper in Cleveland and the state of Ohio. It was designed by John Wellborn Root of the Chicago-based architectural firm Burnham & Root.

Design

The Society for Savings Building was designed with a combination of Gothic, Romanesque, and Renaissance architectural styles. It contains elements of each in its granite pillars, arched window frames and red sandstone facade.

History

The Society for Savings Building was constructed to serve as office space for Cleveland's Society for Savings. Though structurally complete in late 1889, the building did not officially open until June 23, 1890. The building was at the time dubbed "Ohio's skyscraper" by locals, as it was the first modern high-rise building to be constructed in the city and the state. It went on to serve as the headquarters of the Brotherhood of Locomotive Engineers, or BLE, from 1896 until 1910. The building was listed on the National Register of Historic Places on November 7, 1976.

In modern times, the building is one of several structures located at Key Center.  Key Tower (formerly known as the Society Center), the tallest building in Cleveland and in the state of Ohio, was built adjacent to the Society for Savings Building by Society Bank 100 years after it; the lobbies of the two buildings were integrated, and in the process the Society for Savings Building underwent an extensive restoration and renovation project headed by the architectural firm of van Dijk, Pace, Westlake & Partners. The building contains 147,089 square feet (13,665 m2) of office space.

See also
 Marriott at Key Center
 List of tallest buildings in Cleveland

References

1890s architecture in the United States
Skyscraper office buildings in Cleveland
Commercial buildings on the National Register of Historic Places in Ohio
Burnham and Root buildings
Commercial buildings completed in 1890
National Register of Historic Places in Cleveland, Ohio
Office buildings completed in 1890